The Nias language is an Austronesian language spoken on Nias Island and the Batu Islands off the west coast of Sumatra in Indonesia. It is known as Li Niha by its native speakers. It belongs to the Northwest Sumatra–Barrier Islands subgroup which also includes Mentawai and the Batak languages. It had about 770,000 speakers in 2000. There are three main dialects: northern, central and southern. It is an open-syllable language, which means there are no syllable-final consonants.

Dialects

Nias is typically considered to have three dialects.
Northern dialect: particularly the Gunungsitoli variety, Alasa and Lahewa area.
South dialect: South Nias, Gomo Area, Telukdalam Area and Batu Islands.
Central dialect: West Nias, particularly in Sirombu and Mandrehe areas.

Cognate percentage among the dialects of Nias is about 80%.

The northern variant is considered the prestige dialect. The only complete Bible translation is written in the northern dialect and is used by speakers of all dialects.

Phonology

Sundermann (1913) and Halawa et al. (1983) describe them as prenasalized stop  and prenasalized trilled stop  for the northern dialect, while Brown (2005) records them as trill  and trilled stop  for the southern dialect.

The status of initial  is not determined; there are no phonetic vowel-initial words in Nias.

Here, the fricative  only occurs in initial position in the mutated form (see §Noun case marking (mutation)) of nouns beginning with f, e.g.  ~  .
For the northern dialect, only fricative approximant  is reported, corresponding to both sounds of southern Nias. The semivowel  is a distinct phoneme and is written  in common spelling.

Grammar
Nias has an ergative–absolutive alignment. It is the only known ergative–absolutive language in the world that has a "marked absolutive", which means that absolutive case is marked, whereas ergative case is unmarked.

There are no adjectives in Nias, words with that function are taken by verbs.

Pronouns

The following table lists the free and bound pronouns of Nias ( = only used in the northern dialect,  = only used in the southern dialect):

Independent pronouns are used:
as the predicate in nominal clauses

as the P argument of transitive verbs in dependent (including relative and nominalized) clauses

following certain prepositions and  'only'
in fronted (topicalized) position

Absolutive pronouns are used:
as the S argument of independent intransitive and nominal clauses (in the southern dialect, only in realis mood)

as the P argument of transitive verbs in independent clauses

as the stimulus with intransitive verbs expressing emotions or states of mind

Genitive pronouns are used:
as possessor, e.g.  'my father'
following certain prepositions, e.g.  'to me'
as the S argument in nominalized intransitive clauses

as the A argument in nominalized transitive clauses

as the A argument in relative clauses with the P argument of a transitive verb as head

Ergative (realis) pronouns are used:
as the A argument in independent transitive clauses (in the southern dialect, only in realis mood)

Irrealis pronouns are used in the southern dialect:
as the S argument in independent intransitive clauses in irrealis mood

as the A argument in independent transitive clauses in irrealis mood

In the northern dialect, the irrealis pronouns are restricted to third person, and are employed in what Sundermann (1913) calls "jussive" mood.

Noun case marking (mutation)
Case marking of nouns is indicated in Nias by mutation of the initial consonant. Several consonants are subject to mutation as shown in the table below. Where a word begins in a vowel, either n or g is added before the vowel; the choice of n or g is lexically conditioned. (For example,  is 'village federation',  is 'bracelet'.)

Other consonants do not change.

Unmutated case
The unmutated case form is used in citation. It further appears in all functions described above for independent pronouns:
as the predicate in nominal clauses
as the P argument of transitive verbs in dependent (including relative and nominalized) clauses
following certain prepositions and  'only'
in fronted (topicalized) position

Additionally, A arguments in independent transitive clauses appear in unmutated case, cross-referenced by the corresponding ergative or irrealis pronoun.

Mutated case
The mutated case form of the noun corresponds in function to both the absolutive and the genitive pronouns:
as the S argument of independent intransitive and nominal clauses

as the P argument of transitive verbs in independent clauses

as the stimulus with intransitive verbs expressing emotions or states of mind
as possessor

following certain prepositions
as the S argument in nominalized intransitive clauses
as the A argument in nominalized transitive clauses
as the A argument in relative clauses with the P argument of a transitive verb as head

Notes

References

Citations

Bibliography

External links

 Nias wordlist, Austronesian Basic Vocabulary Database
 Online dictionary of Nias
 Kamus Nias-Indonesia (Nias-Indonesian Dictionary)
 Articles on Nias Language (in Indonesian)

Northwest Sumatra–Barrier Islands languages
Languages of Indonesia
North Sumatra